The Communist Party of Canada (Ontario) fielded six candidates in the 2003 Ontario general election.

Candidates

Source for election results: Election Results, Elections Ontario, accessed 2 November 2021.

References

2003